The Trois-Rivières Lions are a professional minor league ice hockey team in the ECHL based in Trois-Rivières, Quebec, Canada. The team began play in the 2021–22 ECHL season, with home games at Colisée Vidéotron. They are affiliated with the Montreal Canadiens of the National Hockey League and Laval Rocket of the American Hockey League.

History 
The city of Trois-Rivières, Quebec, began construction on a replacement for the aging Colisée de Trois-Rivières with an expected completion date of 2021, but had no permanent tenants scheduled. In July 2020, Newfoundland Growlers' majority owner Dean MacDonald (through his group Deacon Sports and Entertainment) came to an agreement with the city to place an ECHL team in Colisée Vidéotron, pending league approval, for the 2021–22 season.  On November 30, the team finalized its lease agreement.  Finally, on January 12, 2021, the team was approved by the ECHL Board of Governors to join the league for the 2021–22 season. On January 19, the Montreal Canadiens had announced that the new team would serve as their ECHL affiliate.

On June 10, 2021, the team name was announced as the Trois-Rivières Lions, named after the only previous professional team to play in the city, the Trois-Rivières Lions, from 1955 to 1960. On June 15, Éric Bélanger was named the team's first head coach.

Season-by-season records

Players

Current roster 
Updated November 29, 2022.

See also 
 List of ice hockey teams in Quebec

References

External links 
 

ECHL teams
Ice hockey clubs established in 2021
Sport in Trois-Rivières
Montreal Canadiens minor league affiliates
2021 establishments in Quebec